Albertavenator (meaning "Alberta hunter") is a genus of small troodontid theropod dinosaur, known from the early Maastrichtian in the Cretaceous period. It contains a single species, A. curriei, named after paleontologist Phil Currie, based on a partial left frontal found in the Horseshoe Canyon Formation of Alberta during the 1990s. Albertavenator's discovery indicates that small dinosaur diversity may be underestimated at present due to the difficulty in identifying species from fragmentary remains.

See also

 Timeline of troodontid research
2017 in archosaur paleontology

References

Late Cretaceous dinosaurs of North America
Troodontids
Maastrichtian life
Fossil taxa described in 2017
Paleontology in Alberta